Saint-Maurice–Champlain is a federal electoral district in Quebec, Canada, that has been represented in the House of Commons of Canada since 2004.

It consists of:
 the City of Shawinigan;
 the Regional County Municipality of Le Haut-Saint-Maurice, including Communauté de Wemotaci Indian Reserve, Coucoucache Indian Reserve No. 24A and Obedjiwan Indian Reserve No. 28; and
 the regional county municipalities of Les Chenaux and Mékinac.

The neighbouring ridings are Abitibi—Baie-James—Nunavik—Eeyou, Roberval—Lac-Saint-Jean, Portneuf—Jacques-Cartier, Trois-Rivières, Berthier—Maskinongé, Joliette, Laurentides—Labelle, and Pontiac.

History
Saint-Maurice—Champlain riding was created in 2003 from parts of Abitibi—Baie-James—Nunavik, Champlain, Roberval and Saint-Maurice ridings.

This riding gained territory from Trois-Rivières during the 2012 electoral redistribution.

Member of Parliament

Election results

See also
 List of Canadian federal electoral districts
 Mauricie
 Past Canadian electoral districts

References

Campaign expense data from Elections Canada
Riding history from the Library of Parliament
2011 Results from Elections Canada

Notes

Quebec federal electoral districts
La Tuque, Quebec
Shawinigan